Mytheon was a free to play massively multiplayer online video game developed by Petroglyph Games. The game incorporated action, role-playing, and strategy elements. Players advanced through the game's Greek mythology-themed dungeons using a deck of collectible spells called power stones.

The game was released on March 3, 2011. After close to six months of operation, UTV True Games announced the shut down of the game servers on July 27, 2011. A reworked version, designed to allow for a single purchase instead, was released on Steam.

References

External links 
 Official website

2011 video games
Massively multiplayer online role-playing games
Windows games
Windows-only games
Video games set in antiquity
Video games based on Greek mythology
Video games scored by Frank Klepacki
Video games developed in the United States

Inactive massively multiplayer online games
Petroglyph Games games